The Estonian national cricket team is the team that represents Estonia in international cricket. They were granted affiliate status in June 2008 by the International Cricket Council (ICC).

The most famous tourists to Estonia have been Shane Warne and Elizabeth Hurley, who supported the ICC event in 2012. Sir Tim Rice, and his team the Heartaches, the MCC, the Lord's Taverners and most recently Carmel & District Cricket Club captained by Timothy Abraham.

In April 2018, the ICC decided to grant full Twenty20 International (T20I) status to all its members. Therefore, all Twenty20 matches played between Estonia and other ICC members after 1 January 2019 will be a full T20I.

Highlights

In the 2007 season, Estonia won over 80% of all their games and in 2008 they won 94% of their games (34 out of 36).

In May 2011, Estonia competed in the European T20 Division 3 Championships in Slovenia, where after all matches were completed, finished as runners-up to a highly experienced Swedish National Team. In August 2011, Estonia finished its international fixtures for the year, by becoming Baltic Champions in a final win over the Lithuanian Cricket Team. During the European T20 Division 3 Championships in Slovenia. Captain Tim Heath scored a remarkable 113 off 45 deliveries. Other significant highlights include:

 2008 Estonia competed won an invitational non-ICC event in Wales
 2009 Estonia competed in a 50 over ICC competition in Corfu, finishing mid table
 2012 Estonia won a round-robin ICC competition in Tallinn against Slovenia and Bulgaria
 2012 Estonia competed in a T20 ICC competition in Corfu, finishing mid-table
 2019 Estonia played Spain and Malta in La Manga, Spain during the 2019 Spain Triangular T20I Series. They lost all their matches.

Domestic cricket

2007 saw the formation of the Estonian cricket league, which consists of four Tallinn-based teams who compete in a round-robin format. Players who are members of the Estonian Cricket League are eligible to be selected for the national side. 2007 and 2008 saw a victory for Kalev CC captained by Andres Burget.

The national competition has seen significant restructure and growth in recent times and in 2020 saw a reshuffle of the domestic league, with 8 teams playing in the league. The further expansion continued in 2021, when the domestic league grew to 12 teams competing. The current clubs include:

Eesti Tigers
Tallinn Hippos
Tallinn Rising Stars 
Tallinn Stallions
Tallinn Strikers
Tartu KK
Tallinn United
Viking Stars
Tallinn Riders
EFP Eagles
Tartu Wolves
Tallinn United Falcons

The Estonian Domestic and Premier League competitions are growing year on year and an intense program of regional development is continuing. Their number of home-grown Estonian players is increasing along with the added experience of a number of expatriate persons from full member nations who have been residing in Estonia for a number of years and are always willing to pass on experience and general playing tips to up and coming Estonians for the future of Cricket here.

Records
International Match Summary — Estonia
 
Last updated 30 July 2022.

Twenty20 International 
T20I record versus other nations

Records complete to T20I #1709. Last updated 30 July 2022.

Other results
For a list of selected international matches played by Estonia, see Cricket Archive.

See also
 Estonia women's national cricket team
 List of Estonia Twenty20 International cricketers

Sources
 Slogging The Slavs: A Paranormal Cricket Tour from the Baltic to the Bosphorus, by Angus Bell

References

External links
 

Cricket
Cricket
National cricket teams
Estonia in international cricket